Alireza Yalda 
(1930-2017) was an Iranian infectious disease physician and professor at Tehran University of Medical Sciences. He is credited as the father of infectious diseases in Iran.
Alireza Yalda Foundation named after him grants awards to young researchers annually.

References

1930 births
2017 deaths
Iranian infectious disease physicians
Academic staff of Tehran University of Medical Sciences
Iranian Science and Culture Hall of Fame recipients in Medicine